is a former Japanese idol singer, and a former member of the idol girl groups HKT48 and AKB48. In HKT48, she was in Team KIV, and in AKB48 in Team B.

Career 

On March 30, 2016, Mio Tomonaga released her first photobook, titled Hinata. With approximately 10,000 copies sold in the first week according to Oricon, it debuted in the second place of the Oricon Photobook Chart and in the 20th place of the general Oricon Book Chart.

Appearances

TV dramas 
 Joshikō Keisatsu (Fuji TV, 2013-2014)
 Majisuka Gakuen 0: Kisarazu Rantōhen, (2015) as Bōyomi
  Ep.16 - Heroine (2015) as Atsuko
 , (2016) as Bōyomi (Tatsunōtoshigo)

Bibliography

Photobooks 
  (30 March 2016, Kodansha)

References

External links 
 Mio Tomonaga's official HKT48 profile 
 Mio Tomonaga's official AKB48 profile 

1998 births
Living people
HKT48
AKB48
AKB48 members
Japanese idols
Japanese women pop singers
Musicians from Fukuoka Prefecture
Universal Music Japan artists
King Records (Japan) artists